The Carthage Theater Days or Journées Théâtrales de Carthage ("Carthage theatre days") is a theatre festival hosted by the government of Tunisia that was started in 1983. Taking place every two years, this theatre festival alternates with the Carthage Film Festival.

References

Festivals in Tunisia